Octavo is a technical term describing the format of a book.

Octavo may also refer to:
pseudonym of Henri Julien (1852–1908), French Canadian artist
 Octavo (Discworld), a grimoire in the Discworld series by Terry Pratchett
 Octavo Corp., a company in Oakland, California, that publishes digital editions of rare books — see Rare Book Room

See also  
 Octave
 Octavio